Cascade School District #5 (Cascade SD 5) is a public school district in Oregon, based in an unincorporated area with a Turner postal address. The school district administration is on the same property as Cascade Junior High School and Cascade High School.

The district's service area includes Turner, Aumsville, Marion, and a small portion of Salem.

It includes five schools, the three elementary schools Turner elementary, Aumsville elementary, and Cloverdale elementary. Then all the elementary schools merge at Cascade Junior High which those students go to the larger Cascade High. The Senior high has a symphonic, marching, and jazz band. The junior high has a beginning and 7th/8th grade band.

References

External links 

At-A-Glance School and District Profiles - Oregon Department of Education

School districts in Oregon
Education in Salem, Oregon
Turner, Oregon
Education in Marion County, Oregon